Zveno (Link) was a group of Ukrainian avant-garde artists formed in the first decade of the 20th century by brothers David Burliuk and Wladimir Burliuk.

Group members included:
David Burliuk
Wladimir Burliuk
Wladimir Baranoff-Rossine
Alexander Bogomazov
Aleksandra Ekster
Zveno could also refer to the exhibition staged by David Burliuk in Kiev. It is described as the first avant-garde exhibition in Russian Empire. Aside from Burliuk, Aleksandra Ekster was cited as one of the organizers of the event, which obtained little success.

References

Ukrainian avant-garde
Ukrainian painters